Timbedra is a department of Hodh Ech Chargui Region in Mauritania.

References 

Departments of Mauritania